This is a very incomplete list of the non-marine molluscs of the country of Australia. They are part of the invertebrate fauna of Australia.

Freshwater gastropods 
The freshwater molluscs of Australia vary greatly in size, shape, biology and evolutionary history, and more than 99% of the native species occur nowhere else on earth. Currently, there are more than 400 native described species and a further 100 species that are undescribed. A Lucid multi-access key  for them, together with descriptions is found at Australian Freshwater Molluscs, Revision 1A.

Ampullariidae

Genus Pomacea 

 Pomacea diffusa  Blume, 1957

Assimineidae

Genus Austroassiminea 

 Austroassiminea letha Solem, Girardi, Slack-Smith & Kendrick, 1982

Genus Aviassiminea 

 Aviassiminea palitans Fukuda & Ponder, 2003

Genus Suterilla 

 Suterilla fluviatilis Fukuda, Ponder & Marshall, 2006 (only found on Norfolk Island)

Genus Taiwanassiminea 

 Taiwanassiminea bedaliensis (Rensch, 1934)
 Taiwanassiminea affinis (Böttger, 1887)

Bithyniidae

Genus Gabbia 

 Gabbia adusta Ponder, 2003
 Gabbia affinis (E. A. Smith, 1882)
 Gabbia beecheyi Ponder, 2003
 Gabbia campicola Ponder, 2003
 Gabbia carinata Ponder, 2003
 Gabbia clathrata Ponder, 2003
 Gabbia davisi Ponder, 2003
 Gabbia fontana Ponder, 2003
 Gabbia iredalei Cotton, 1942
 Gabbia kendricki Ponder, 2003
 Gabbia kessneri Ponder, 2003
 Gabbia lutaria Ponder, 2003
 Gabbia microcosta Ponder, 2003
 Gabbia napierensis Ponder, 2003
 Gabbia obesa  Ponder, 2003
 Gabbia pallidula Ponder, 2003
 Gabbia rotunda Ponder, 2003
 Gabbia smithii (Tate, 1882)
 Gabbia spiralis Ponder, 2003
 Gabbia tumida Ponder, 2003
 Gabbia vertiginosa (Frauenfeld, 1862)

Clenchiellidae

Genus Coleglabra 

 Coleglabra nordaustralis Ponder, Fukuda and Hallan 2014

Genus Colenuda 
 Colenuda kessneri Ponder, Fukuda and Hallan 2014

Cochliopidae

Genus Pyrgophorus 

 Pyrgophorus platyrachis Thompson, 1968

Glacidorbidae

Genus Benthodorbis 

 Benthodorbis fultoni Ponder & Avern, 2000
 Benthodorbis pawpela (B. J. Smith,1979)

Neritiliidae

Genus Neritilia 

 Neritilia vulgaris Kano and Kase, 2003

Pachychilidae

Genus Pseudopotamis 

 Pseudopotamis semoni Martens, 1894
 Pseudopotamis supralirata (E. A. Smith, 1887)

Tateidae

Genus Ascorhis 

 Ascorhis occidua Ponder & Clark, 1988
 Ascorhis tasmanica (von Martens, 1858)

Genus Austropyrgus 
 Austropyrgus abercrombiensis Clark, Miller & Ponder, 2003
Austropyrgus angasi (E. A. Smith, 1882)
Austropyrgus aslini Clark, Miller & Ponder, 2003
Austropyrgus avius Clark, Miller & Ponder, 2003
 Austropyrgus bungoniensis Clark, Miller & Ponder, 2003
 Austropyrgus bunyaensis Miller, Ponder & Clark, 1999
 Austropyrgus centralia (Ponder, Colgan, Terzis, Clark & Miller, 1996)
 Austropyrgus colensis Clark, Miller & Ponder, 2003
 Austropyrgus cooma (Iredale, 1943)
 Austropyrgus dyerianus (Petterd, 1879)
 Austropyrgus elongatus (May, 1921)
 Austropyrgus eumekes Clark, Miller & Ponder, 2003
 Austropyrgus foris (Ponder, Colgan, Clark, Miller & Terzis, 1994)
 Austropyrgus grampianensis (Gabriel, 1939)
 Austropyrgus halletensis Clark, Miller & Ponder, 2003
 Austropyrgus nepeanensis Clark, Miller & Ponder, 2003
 Austropyrgus niger (Quoy & Gaimard, 1834)
 Austropyrgus ora Clark, Miller & Ponder, 2003
 Austropyrgus parvus Clark, Miller & Ponder, 2003
 Austropyrgus pusillus Clark, Miller & Ponder, 2003
 Austropyrgus rectoides Clark, Miller & Ponder, 2003
 Austropyrgus rectus (Ponder, Colgan, Clark, Miller & Terzis, 1994)
 Austropyrgus ronkershawi Clark, Miller & Ponder, 2003
 Austropyrgus salvus Clark, Miller & Ponder, 2003
 Austropyrgus simsonianus (Brazier, 1875)
 Austropyrgus sinuatus Clark, Miller & Ponder, 2003
 Austropyrgus smithii (Petterd, 1889)
 Austropyrgus sparsus (Iredale, 1944)
 Austropyrgus tateiformis Clark, Miller & Ponder, 2003
 Austropyrgus tumidus Clark, Miller & Ponder, 2003
 Austropyrgus turbatus (Ponder, Colgan, Clark, Miller & Terzis, 1994)

Genus Beddomeia 
 Beddomeia hullii Petterd, 1889
 Beddomeia launcestonensis (Johnston, 1879)
 Beddomeia minima Petterd, 1889

Genus Caldicochlea 
Caldicochlea is a genus with two species, endemic to the Dalhousie Springs supergroup.

 Caldicochlea globosa (Ponder, Colgan, Terzis, Clark & Miller, 1996)
 Caldicochlea harrisi (Ponder, Colgan, Terzis, Clark & Miller, 1996)

Genus Carnarvoncochlea 

 Carnarvoncochlea carnarvonensis (Ponder & Clark, 1990)
 Carnarvoncochlea exigua (Ponder & Clark, 1990)

Genus Conondalia 

 Conondalia buzwilsoni Ponder, Zhan, Hallan & Shea, 2019

Genus Jardinella 

 Jardinella thaanumi (Pilsbry, 1900)
 Jardinella tullyensis Ponder, 1991
 Jardinella tumorosa Ponder, 1991

Genus Nundalia 

 Nundalia secreta Ponder, Zhan, Hallan & Shea, 2019

Genus Pseudotricula 

 Pseudotricula arthurclarkei Ponder, Clark, Eberhard & Studdert, 2005
 Pseudotricula auriforma Ponder, Clark, Eberhard & Studdert, 2005
 Pseudotricula conica Ponder, Clark, Eberhard & Studdert, 2005
 Pseudotricula eberhardi Ponder, 1992
 Pseudotricula elongata Ponder, Clark, Eberhard & Studdert, 2005
 Pseudotricula expandolabra Ponder, Clark, Eberhard & Studdert, 2005
 Pseudotricula progenitor Ponder, Clark, Eberhard & Studdert, 2005

Genus Springvalia 

 Springvalia isolata (Ponder & Clark, 1990)

Genus Tatea 

 Tatea rufilabris (A. Adams, 1862)
 Tatea huonensis (Tenison Woods, 1876)

Genus Trochidrobia 
Trochidrobia  is a genus of small, gastropod, belonging to the family Tateidae. Trochidrobia is endemic to Lake Eyre supergroup, found in artesian springs between Marree and Oodnadatta (northern South Australia). Trochidrobia have smooth and thin periuoostraca, and thin, simple and oval-shaped opercula. There are currently four species described in the genus Trochidrobia:

 Trochidrobia inflata Ponder, Hershler and Jenkins, 1989
 Trochidrobia minuta Ponder, Hershler and Jenkins, 1989
 Trochidrobia punicea Ponder, Hershler and Jenkins, 1989
 Trochidrobia smithi Ponder, Hershler and Jenkins, 1989

Genus Victodrobia 

 Victodrobia burni Ponder & Clark, 1993
 Victodrobia elongata Ponder & Clark, 1993
 Victodrobia millerae Ponder & Clark, 1993
 Victodrobia victoriensis Ponder & Clark, 1993

Genus Westrapyrgus 
 Westrapyrgus slacksmithae Ponder, Clark and Miller, 1999
 Westrapyrgus westralis Ponder, Clark & Miller, 1999

Thiaridae

Genus Melanoides 
 Melanoides tuberculata (Müller, 1774)

Genus Melasma 
 Melasma onca (Adams and Angas, 1864)

Genus Mienplotia 
Mieniplotia scabra (O. F. Müller, 1774)

Genus Plotiopsis 
 Plotiopsis balonnensis (Conrad, 1850)

Genus Ripalania 
 Ripalania queenslandica (Smith, 1882)

Genus Sermyla 
 Sermyla riqueti Grateloup, 1840
 Sermyla venustula (Brot, 1877)

Genus Stenomelania 
 Stenomelania cf. aspirans (Hinds, 1844)
 Stenomelania denisoniensis (Brot, 1877

Genus Thiara 
 Thiara amarula (Linnaeus, 1758)
 Thiara australis Lea & Lea, 1850

Viviparidae 
Cipangopaludina japonica (Martens, 1861) - known from the Austral Watergardens at Cowan, New South Wales in Sydney.
Larina lirata (Tate, 1887)
Larina strangei A. Adams, 1864
Notopala ampullaroides (Reeve, 1863)
 Notopala essingtonensis (Frauenfeld, 1862)
 Notopala hanleyi (Frauenfeld, 1864)
 Notopala kingi (A. Adams & Angas, 1864)
 Notopala kingi kingi (A. Adams & Angas, 1864)
 Notopala kingi suprafasciata (Tryon, 1866)
 Notopala sublineata Conrad, 1850
 Notopala sublineata sublineata Conrad, 1850
 Notopala sublineata alisoni (Brazier, 1879)
 Notopala waterhousii (Adams & Angus, 1864)
 Notopala tricincta (E. A. Smith, 1882)
Sinotaia guangdungensis (Kobelt, 1906) - known from the Lane Cove River, Sydney, New South Wales (Shea 1994).

Land gastropods 

Pupillidae
 Gyliotrachela catherina Solem, 1981
 Pupilla ficulnea (Tate, 1894)

Bothriembryontidae
 Bothriembryon balteolus Iredale, 1939
 Bothriembryon barretti Iredale, 1930
 Bothriembryon costulatus (Potiez & Michaud, 1838)
 Bothriembryon cummingsi Morrison & Schneider, 2021
 Bothriembryon distinctus Iredale, 1939
 Bothriembryon fragilis Morrison, Schneider & Whisson, 2019
 Bothriembryon grohi Morrison & Schneider, 2022
 Bothriembryon kingii (Gray, 1825)
 Bothriembryon mastersi (Cox, 1867)
 Bothriembryon maxwelli (Kobelt, 1901)
 Bothriembryon nanambinia Morrison, 2021
 Bothriembryon onslowi (Cox, 1864)
 Bothriembryon revectus Iredale, 1939
 Bothriembryon reseotinctus Morrison & Schneider, 2022
 Bothriembryon schneideri Morrison, 2021
 Bothriembryon toolinna Schneider & Morrison, 2018
 Bothriembryon wagoeensis Morrison & Schneider, 2022
 Bothriembryon whitleyi Iredale, 1939 - possibly extinct

Charopidae
 Arcadiaropa sunnyholt Stanisic, 2020
 Brigaloropa costulata Stanisic, 2020
 Bindiropa irwinae Stanisic, 2022
 Carnaropa racecourse Stanisic, 2022
 Carnaropa salvatorosa Stanisic, 2022
 Cineropa hewittorum Stanisic, 2022
 Cineropa rama Stanisic, 2022
 Discocharopa aperta (Möllendorff, 1888)
 Eddiea brigge Stanisic, 2022
 Eddiea carnarvon Stanisic, 2022
 Eddiea oakwells Stanisic, 2022
 Eddiea waddybrae Stanisic, 2022
 Gyrocochlea occidentalis Stanisic, 2022
 Platyumbiropa grafton Stanisic, 2022
 Platyumbiropa tabor Stanisic, 2022
 Rhophodon moffatt Stanisic, 2020
 Spiraliropa carnarvon Stanisic, 2010
 Stanisicaropa covidurnus Stanisic, 2022
 Tristanoropa crowman Stanisic, 2020
 Tristanoropa palmgrove Stanisic, 2020
 Tristanoropa saddler Stanisic, 2020

Camaenidae
 Amphidromus cognatus Fulton, 1907
 Amplirhagada epiphallica Köhler, 2011
 Amplirhagada alicunda Köhler, 2011
 Amplirhagada alkuonides Köhler, 2011
 Amplirhagada anderdonensis Köhler, 2010
 Amplirhagada angustocauda Köhler, 2011
 Amplirhagada atlantis Köhler, 2011
 Amplirhagada basilica Köhler, 2010
 Amplirhagada bendraytoni Köhler, 2011
 Amplirhagada berthierana Köhler, 2010
 Amplirhagada boongareensis Köhler, 2010
 Amplirhagada buffonensis Köhler, 2010
 Amplirhagada camdenensis Köhler, 2010
 Amplirhagada carsoniana Köhler, 2011
 Amplirhagada coffea Köhler, 2011
 Amplirhagada davidsoniana Köhler, 2011
 Amplirhagada decora Köhler, 2010
 Amplirhagada descartesana Köhler, 2010
 Amplirhagada discoidea Köhler, 2011
 Amplirhagada dubitabile Köhler, 2010
 Amplirhagada euroa Köhler, 2010
 Amplirhagada forrestiana Köhler, 2011
 Amplirhagada gardneriana Köhler, 2011
 Amplirhagada gemina Köhler, 2010
 Amplirhagada gibsoni Köhler, 2010
 Amplirhagada globosa Köhler, 2011
 Amplirhagada indistincta Köhler, 2010
 Amplirhagada inusitata Köhler, 2011
 Amplirhagada kessneri Köhler, 2010
 Amplirhagada kimberleyana Köhler, 2010
 Amplirhagada lamarckiana Köhler, 2010
 Amplirhagada lindsayae Köhler, 2011
 Amplirhagada mckenziei Köhler, 2010
 Amplirhagada montesqieuana Köhler, 2010
 Amplirhagada moraniana Köhler, 2011
 Amplirhagada ponderi Köhler, 2010
 Amplirhagada puescheli Köhler, 2010
 Amplirhagada regia Köhler, 2010
 Amplirhagada sinenomine Köhler, 2011
 Amplirhagada solemiana Köhler, 2010
 Amplirhagada sphaeroidea Köhler, 2010
 Amplirhagada storriana Köhler, 2011
 Amplirhagada tricenaria Köhler, 2010
 Amplirhagada uwinsensis Köhler, 2010
 Amplirhagada vialae Köhler, 2011
 Amplirhagada yorkensis Köhler, 2010
 Arnhemtrachia ramingining Köhler & Criscione, 2013
 Australocosmica augustae Köhler, 2011
 Australocosmica bernoulliensis Criscione & Köhler, 2013
 Australocosmica buffonensis Criscione & Köhler, 2013
 Australocosmica crassicostata Criscione & Köhler, 2013
 Australocosmica nana Criscione & Köhler, 2013
 Australocosmica pallida Criscione & Köhler, 2013
 Australocosmica rotunda Criscione & Köhler, 2013
 Australocosmica sanctumpatriciusae Köhler, 2011
 Australocosmica vulcanica Köhler, 2011
 Austrochloritis copelandensis Shea & Köhler, 2020
 Austrochloritis niangala Shea & Griffiths, 2010
 Austrochloritis nundinalis Iredale, 1943
 Baudinella boongareensis Köhler, 2011
 Baudinella magna Criscione & Köhler, 2014
 Baudinella margaritata Criscione & Köhler, 2014
 Baudinella occidentalis Köhler, 2011
 Baudinella setobaudinioides Köhler, 2011
 Baudinella thielei Köhler, 2011
 Baudinella tuberculata Köhler, 2011
 Cardiotrachia bastionensis Criscione & Köhler, 2014
 Carinotrachia admirale Köhler, 2010 - with two of its subspecies: Carinotrachia admirale admirale Köhler, 2010 and Carinotrachia admirale elevata Köhler, 2010
 Denhamiana laetifica Stanisic, 2013
 Denhamiana leichhardti Stanisic, 2013
 Globorhagada confusa Köhler, 2011
 Globorhagada uwinsensis Köhler, 2011
 Globorhagada wurroolgu Köhler, 2011
 Globorhagada yoowadan Köhler, 2011
 Kimberleydiscus Köhler, 2010 - with the only one species Kimberleydiscus fasciatus Köhler, 2010
 Kimberleymelon Köhler, 2010 - with the only one species Kimberleymelon tealei Köhler, 2010
 Kimberleytrachia achernaria Köhler, 2011
 Kimberleytrachia aequum Köhler, 2011
 Kimberleytrachia alphacentauri Köhler, 2011
 Kimberleytrachia amplirhagadoides Köhler, 2011
 Kimberleytrachia canopi Köhler, 2011
 Kimberleytrachia chartacea Köhler, 2011
 Kimberleytrachia hirsuta Köhler, 2011
 Kimberleytrachia jacksonensis Criscione & Köhler, 2014
 Kimberleytrachia leopardus Criscione & Köhler, 2014
 Kimberleytrachia nelsonensis Criscione & Köhler, 2014
 Kimberleytrachia serrata Criscione & Köhler, 2014
 Kimberleytrachia setosa Criscione & Köhler, 2014
 Kimberleytrachia silvaepluvialis Criscione & Köhler, 2014
 Kimberleytrachia somniator Köhler, 2011
 Kimboraga cascadensis Köhler, 2011
 Kimboraga glabra Köhler, 2011
 Kimboraga wulalam Köhler, 2011
 Molema stankowskii Köhler, 2011
 Molema tenuicostata Criscione & Köhler, 2014
 Nanotrachia carinata Köhler & Criscione, 2013
 Nanotrachia coronata Köhler & Criscione, 2013
 Nanotrachia costulata Köhler & Criscione, 2013
 Nanotrachia intermedia (Solem, 1984)
 Nanotrachia levis Köhler & Criscione, 2013
 Nanotrachia orientalis (Solem, 1984)
 Noctepuna cerea (Hedley, 1894)
 Nodulabium solidum Criscione & Köhler, 2013
 Ototrachia compressa Criscione & Köhler, 2013
 Pallidelix simonhudsoni Stanisic, 2015
 Pseudomesodontrachia gregoriana Criscione & Köhler, 2013
 Rachita carltonensis Criscione & Köhler, 2014
 Retroterra acutocostata Köhler, 2011
 Retroterra aequabilis Köhler, 2011
 Retroterra dichroma Criscione & Köhler, 2014
 Retroterra discoidea Köhler, 2011
 Retroterra nana Criscione & Köhler, 2014
 Rhagada angulata Solem, 1997
 Rhagada biggeana Köhler, 2011
 Rhagada bulgana Solem, 1997
 Rhagada capensis Solem, 1997
 Rhagada convicta (Cox, 1870)
 Rhagada crystalla Solem, 1985
 Rhagada cygna Solem, 1997
 Rhagada dampierana Solem, 1997
 Rhagada dominica Köhler, 2011
 Rhagada dringi (L. Pfeiffer, 1846)
 Rhagada elachystoma (Martens, 1878)
 Rhagada felicitas Köhler, 2011
 Rhagada gatta Iredale, 1939
 Rhagada globosa Solem, 1997
 Rhagada harti Solem, 1985
 Rhagada intermedia Solem, 1997
 Rhagada karajarri Burghardt & Köhler, 2015
 Rhagada kessneri Köhler, 2011
 Rhagada minima Solem, 1997
 Rhagada perprima Iredale, 1939
 Rhagada pilbarana Solem, 1997
 Rhagada plicata Preston, 1914
 Rhagada primigena Köhler, 2011
 Rhagada radleyi Preston, 1908
 Rhagada reinga (L. Pfeiffer, 1846)
 Rhagada richardsonii (E. A. Smith, 1874)
 Rhagada sheaei Köhler, 2011
 Rhagada torulus (Férussac, 1820)
 Rhagada worora Burghardt & Köhler, 2015
 Setobaudinia capillacea Köhler, 2011
 Setobaudinia garlinju Köhler, 2011
 Setobaudinia gumalamala Köhler, 2011
 Setobaudinia herculea Köhler, 2011
 Setobaudinia insolita Köhler, 2011
 Setobaudinia joycei Köhler, 2011
 Setobaudinia kalumburuana Köhler, 2011
 Setobaudinia karczewski Köhler, 2011
 Setobaudinia ngurraali Köhler, 2011
 Setobaudinia quinta Köhler, 2011
 Setobaudinia umbadayi Köhler, 2011
 Setobaudinia wuyurru Köhler, 2011
 Setocallosa pathutchingsae Criscione & Köhler, 2015
 Torresitrachia allouarni Köhler, 2011
 Torresitrachia aquilonia Köhler, 2011
 Torresitrachia baudini Köhler, 2011
 Torresitrachia brookei Köhler, 2011
 Torresitrachia eclipsis Köhler, 2011
 Torresitrachia flindersi Köhler, 2011
 Torresitrachia freycineti Köhler, 2011
 Torresitrachia girgarinae Köhler, 2011
 Torresitrachia hartogi Köhler, 2011
 Torresitrachia houtmani dampieri Köhler, 2011
 Torresitrachia houtmani houtmani Köhler, 2011
 Torresitrachia janszi Köhler, 2011
 Torresitrachia leichhardti Köhler, 2011
 Torresitrachia tasmani Köhler, 2011
 Torresitrachia urvillei Köhler, 2011

Freshwater bivalves
The freshwater mollusks of Australia vary greatly in size, shape, biology and evolutionary history, and more than 99% of the native species occur nowhere else on earth. Currently, there are 46 bivalve species that are described with several other known species yet to be described. 
Corbulidae

 Lentidium dalyfluvialis Hallan & Willan, 2010

Cyrenidae

 Batissa australis (Deshayes, 1855) 
 Batissa violacea (Lamarck, 1818)
 Corbicula australis (Deshayes, 1830)
 Corbicula fluminea Müller, 1774

Hyriidae

 Alathyria condola Iredale, 1943
 Alathyria jacksoni Iredale, 1934
 Alathyria pertexta pertexta Iredale, 1934
 Alathyria pertexta wardi Iredale, 1943
 Alathyria profuga (Gould, 1850)
 Cucumerunio novaehollandiae (Gray, 1834)
 Hyridella aquilonalis (Iredale, 1934)
 Hyridella australis (Lamarck, 1819)
 Hyridella depressa (Lamarck, 1819)
 Hyridella drapeta (Iredale, 1934)
 Hyridella glenelgensis Dennant, 1898
 Hyridella interserta (Iredale, 1934)
 Hyridella narracanensis (Cotton & Gabriel, 1932)
 Lortiella froggatti (Iredale, 1934)
 Lortiella opertanea Ponder & Bayer, 2004
 Lortiella rugata (Sowerby, 1868)
 Westralunio carteri Iredale, 1934 
 Velesunio ambiguus (Philippi, 1847)
 Velesunio angasi (Sowerby, 1867)
 Velesunio moretonicus (Sowerby, 1865)
 Velesunio wilsonii (Lea, 1859)

Lasaeidae

 Arthritica sp. (new species)

Mytilidae (brackish)

 Limnoperna fortunei (Dunker, 1857)
 Xenostrobus securis (Lamarck, 1819)

Sphaeriidae

 Pisidium aslini Kuiper, 1983
 Musculium kendricki (Kuiper, 1983)
 Musculium lacusedes (Iredale, 1943)
 Musculium cf. lacustre (Müller, 1774)
 Musculium problematicum (Gabriel, 1939)
 Musculium quirindi Korniushin, 2000
 Musculium tasmanicum queenslandicum (. A. Smith, 1883)
 Musculium tasmanicum tasmanicum (Tenison-Woods, 1876)
 Musculium tatiarae (Cotton & Godfrey, 1938)
 Pisidium carum (Cotton, 1953)
 Pisidium centrale Korniushin, 2000
 Pisidium etheridgei E.A.Smith, 1883
 Pisidium fultoni Kuiper, 1983
 Pisidium hallae Kuiper, 1983
 Pisidium kosciusko (Iredale, 1943)
 Pisidium ponderi Korniushin, 2000
 Pisidium tasmanicum Tenison-Woods, 1876
 Pisidium australiense Korniushin, 2000

Trapezidae

 Fluviolanatus subtortus (Dunker, 1857)

See also 
 List of marine molluscs of Australia
 List of non-marine molluscs of Papua New Guinea
 List of non-marine molluscs of New Caledonia
 List of non-marine molluscs of New Zealand

References

External links
 Cox J. C. (1868). A monograph of Australian land shells. William Maddock, Sydney. 110 pp. + 18 plates.

Non-Marine
Molluscs, Non
Australia, Non-Marine
Australia, Non
Australia